Silver Dolphin Books is a publisher of activity, novelty, and educational nonfiction books for preschoolers to 12-year-olds. Their focus is to create books that engage and inspire children to learn more about the world around them while fostering a love of reading, exploration, and creative expression. From illustrated board books for toddlers, to interactive play and building sets, to sound books made for story time, they develop books that are designed to both enlighten and entertain.

Silver Dolphin Books are distributed by Publishers Group West. They are an imprint of Printers Row Publishing Group, whose other imprints are Thunder Bay Press, Portable Press, and Canterbury Classics.

Silver Dolphin was founded by the book distributor Advanced Marketing Services. Advanced Marketing Services was acquired by Baker & Taylor in 2007. Readerlink Distribution Services acquired Silver Dolphin from Baker & Taylor in 2015.

References

External links

Book publishing companies based in California
Companies based in San Diego
Publishing companies established in 1990